In a Māori legend attributed by ethnographer John White to the Ngāti Hau tribe, Mārikoriko (Twilight) is the first woman, created by Ārohirohi (Shimmering heat) from the heat of the sun and the echoing cliff. She married Tiki, the first man, and gave birth to Hine-kau-ataata (Woman floating in shadows).

References 

Legendary Māori people
Legendary progenitors

Women in mythology
Mythological first humans